Mianeh-ye Kord Ahmad (also Romanized as Mīāneh-ye Kord Aḩmad; also known as Mīāneh) is a village in Nowjeh Mehr Rural District, Siah Rud District, Jolfa County, East Azerbaijan Province, Iran. At the 2006 census, its population was 43, in 12 families.

References 

Populated places in Jolfa County